Runaround was a children's game show produced by Southern Television for the ITV network between 2 September 1975 and 7 September 1981. It was much more successful than the original American version. The original host was comedian Mike Reid. In 1977 his place was taken by Leslie Crowther and Stan Boardman, before Reid returned in 1978. The ball in tube scoring was copied from the US version but with two colours; red worth one point for a correct answer and yellow worth two points for being the only contestant to choose the right answer (this was reversed in later series). Metal Mickey made his screen debut on the British version of the show after being discovered by the show's in-vision researcher, Tim Edmunds. The series ended when Southern Television's franchise ended at the end of 1981. The game was also incorporated into the two seasons of the short-lived ITV Saturday morning show Saturday Banana hosted by Bill Oddie from 1978.

A spin-off entitled Poparound was produced by Central and aired between 19 June 1985 and 4 June 1986 with Gary Crowley as the host.

Transmissions

Runaround

Out of 103 episodes from 12 series that were made during its 6-year run, 33 survived from the archives, which included Episode 4 of Series 8, Episodes 5 & 9 of Series 9, The 1979 Christmas Special, Episodes 1, 3–5, 7–8 & 10–13 of Series 10, Episodes 1–7 & 9–14 of Series 11 and all 6 episodes of Series 12.

Poparound

References

External links
 
 

1975 British television series debuts
1986 British television series endings
1970s British children's television series
1980s British children's television series
British children's game shows
British television shows featuring puppetry
1970s British game shows
1980s British game shows
ITV game shows
Television series by ITV Studios
Television shows produced by Southern Television
Television shows produced by Central Independent Television
English-language television shows